An Advanced Concept Technology Demonstration enables the evaluation of mature advanced technology for usage by the United States military. These demonstrations allow technology evaluation earlier and cheaper than is possible through the formal acquisition of new production capabilities. They must be sponsored by an operational user with approval and oversight from the Deputy Under Secretary of Defense for Advanced Systems and Concepts.  None have been initiated since 2006, when the deputy under secretary initiated the follow-on Joint Concept Technology Demonstration program to emphasize multiservice technology development and improved planning for transition to operations.

Programs

The following programs were completed under the Advanced Concept Technology Demonstration framework
 Global Hawk
 DarkStar
 JPADS

References

Further reading

External links
 

Military technology
Evaluation methods